.fm is the country code top-level domain (ccTLD) for the Federated States of Micronesia, an independent island nation located in the Pacific Ocean.

Except for reserved names like .com.fm, .net.fm, .org.fm and others, any person in the world can register a .fm domain for a fee, much of the income from which goes to the government and people of the islands. The domain name is popular (and thus economically valuable) for FM radio stations and streaming audio websites (other similar ccTLDs are .am, .tv, .cd, .dj and .mu); a notable example is Last.fm, a social music website.

On March 29, 2018, .fm began allowing registration of emoji domains.

Usage
Aside from Micronesians and the audio streaming industry, the ccTLD is also used by companies such as:

 Ask.fm, website through which people ask and answer questions
 alienradio.fm, website used to promote Coldplay's 2021 album Music of the Spheres
 DI.FM, internet radio broadcaster consisting of over 90 channels dedicated exclusively to electronic music
Last.fm, website that allows users to track their music listening history
 Libre.fm, social music platform based on free software
 Overcast.fm, iOS podcast listening software
Relay.fm, an online podcasting network run by Myke Hurley and Stephen Hackett
setlist.fm, website providing a database to view and share past set lists from musical performances
Tastebuds.fm, dating website for music fans
 thefuture.fm, website providing a platform for DJs to distribute their mixes, and a source for internet radio
Wavy.fm, website that allows users to track their music listening history

Accredited registrars

 Moniker
 Domain Discount24
 Key-Systems
 Gandi.net
 Name.com
 101 Domain
 EasySpace
 Idotz.net
 INWX
 Hexonet
 Marcaria (company)
 EnCirca
 Safenames
 Ascio
 Lexsynergy

See also
Internet in the Federated States of Micronesia
Internet in the United States
.us

References

External links
 IANA .fm whois information
 dotFM, the domain registry for .fm names

Country code top-level domains
Communications in the Federated States of Micronesia
Domain hacks

sv:Toppdomän#F